Kalateh-ye Shahidan (also Romanized as Kalāteh-ye Shahīdān; also known as Kalāteh-ye Qāderī) is a village in Hokmabad Rural District, Atamalek District, Jowayin County, Razavi Khorasan Province, Iran. At the 2006 census, its population was 259, in 66 families.

References 

Populated places in Joveyn County